The 2019 AFLX tournament was the second Australian Football League (AFL) pre-season series of matches, played under the laws of AFLX, a variation of Australian rules football. The tournament took place on 22 February 2019 at Melbourne's Marvel Stadium.

Background
The league abandoned the format adopted for the inaugural series which featured all 18 AFL clubs, and instead appointed four high-profile players as captain of their respective teams.  midfielder and Brownlow Medallist Patrick Dangerfield captained the Bolts,  captain and fellow Brownlow winner Nat Fyfe captained the Flyers,  forward Eddie Betts captained the Deadlys, and  forward and three-time Coleman Medallist Jack Riewoldt captained the Rampage. The teams had 14 players each, with eight on the field and six on the bench.

Rule Changes
A new rule was added to the competition where teams could nominate one of their players on the field to be the Gatorade Game Changer for the last five minutes of the game. The Game Changer had the ability to score double the points of any other player; a behind scored by him would be worth two points, a goal would be worth 12 points, and a super goal would be worth 20 points.

Teams

Results

Ladder

Notes 
1.Replaced Robbie Gray who withdrew due to injury.
2.Replaced Chad Wingard who withdrew due to injury.
3.Replaced Joel Hamling who withdrew due to injury.
4.Replaced Steven May who withdrew due to injury.
5.Replaced Jeremy Cameron who withdrew due to injury.

Draft
A draft of 48 selections was broadcast on Wednesday 6 February by Network Seven and Fox Footy after being held in secret the previous day.

The draft featured 12 selections by each captain with a snake draft order determined by random draw on the night of the draft. No more than four players from each AFL club, inclusive of the pre-selected captains and vice-captains, were eligible to play in the tournament.

References

External links
 Official website

2019
AFLX competition
2019 in Australian rules football